Pouteria cotinifolia is an Australian tree in the family Sapotaceae. The common names include small-leaved plum, yellow lemon and small-leaved coondoo. It occurs in the drier rainforests from the Richmond River, New South Wales to the Wenlock River in tropical Queensland.

It belongs to the large genus Pouteria which occurs across the tropics from South America to Indonesia and into eastern Australia. A genetic analysis of material found that Pouteria cotinifolia was most closely related to Pouteria eerwah and Pouteria australis was a sister to the two species, the three forming a distinct group.

Flowering occurs between February and March. The fruit is glossy black, usually containing one shining light brown seed. The seed has a lengthwise scar.

Two varieties are recognized:
Pouteria cotinifolia var. pubescens
Pouteria cotinifolia var. cotinifolia

References

cotinifolia
Trees of Australia
Flora of Queensland
Flora of New South Wales